Spanton is a surname. Notable people with the surname include:

Helen Margaret Spanton (1877–1934), British artist and suffragette
Mabel Mary Spanton (1874–c.1940), British artist 
Tim Spanton (born 1957), British journalist
William Spanton
William Silas Spanton (1845–1930), British artist, art historian and photographer